Carl Schmitz-Pleis, originally Karl Schmitz (21 September 1877, Hennef - 1943, Düsseldorf) was a German painter.

Life and work 
At first, he signed his works with his birth name, but later adopted "Carl Schmitz-Pleis" as a more distinctive artistic pseudonym. Carl was a frequent visitor there.

In the Spring of 1910, he and several other members of the group travelled to Italy, with the goal of "capturing nature in the sunlight". From 1913 to 1928, he was a member of Malkasten, another progressive association.

In his later years, he rarely left Düsseldorf; dying unmarried, childless, and apparently forgotten, in 1943.

Generally, he is associated with the Düsseldorfer Malerschule. His works cover a wide range of genres, including landscapes, still-lifes, and portraits. The influence of Paul Cézanne is readily noticeable.

References

Further reading 
 "Schmitz-Pleis, Carl". In: Hans Vollmer (Ed.): Allgemeines Lexikon der bildenden Künstler des XX. Jahrhunderts, Vol. 4: Q–U. E. A. Seemann, Leipzig 1958, pg.204
 Kunstmuseum Düsseldorf, Galerie Paffrath (Hrsg.): Lexikon der Düsseldorfer Malerschule 1819–1918. Band 3: Nabert – Zwecker. München 1998, ISBN 3-7654-3011-0, S. 224.

External links 

 More works by Schmitz-Pleis @ ArtNet

1877 births
1943 deaths
German painters
German landscape painters
German portrait painters
Kunstakademie Düsseldorf alumni
People from Hennef (Sieg)